The Assemblies of God Theological Seminary (AGTS) is a seminary located in Springfield, Missouri.

History
The Assemblies of God Theological Seminary was founded in 1972. The enrollment as of Fall 2006 was 474. In 2010, the school was merged with Evangel University.

Programs
As of Summer 2009, the seminary offers the Master of Divinity (M.Div.), Master of Arts (M.A.) in Counseling, Christian Ministries, Intercultural Ministries, and Theological Studies, the Doctor of Ministry (D.Min.), the Doctor of Missiology (D.Miss.), the Ph.D. in Intercultural Studies and the Ph.D. in Bible and Theology degrees.

Accreditation
The seminary is accredited professionally by the Association of Theological Schools in the United States and Canada and regionally by The Higher Learning Commission of the North Central Association of Colleges and Schools to award graduate degrees.

References

External links
Official website
ATS profile of Assemblies of God Theological Seminary

Assemblies of God seminaries and theological colleges
Seminaries and theological colleges in Missouri
Educational institutions established in 1972
1972 establishments in Missouri